Barbara Frischmuth (born 5 July 1941 in Altaussee, Salzkammergut) is an Austrian writer of poetry and prose.

She is a member of the Grazer Gruppe (the Graz Authors' Assembly), along with Peter Handke.

Books 
Die Klosterschule, 1968
Geschichten für Stanek, 1969
Tage und Jahre. Sätze zur Situation, 1971
Das Verschwinden des Schattens in der Sonne, 1973.
Rückkehr zum vorläufigen Ausgangspunkt, 1973.
Haschen nach Wind. Erzählungen, 1974.
Die Mystifikationen der Sophie Silber, 1976.
Amy oder Die Metamorphose, 1978.
Entzug - ein Menetekel der zärtlichsten Art, 1979.
Kai und die Liebe zu den Modellen, 1979.
Bindungen, 1980.
Landschaft für Engel, 1981.
Die Frau im Mond, 1982.
Vom Leben des Pierrot, 1982.
Traumgrenze, 1983.
Kopftänzer, 1984.
Herrin der Tiere, 1986.
Über die Verhältnisse, 1987.
Mörderische Märchen, 1989.
Einander Kind, 1990.
Mister Rosa oder Die Schwierigkeit, kein Zwerg zu sein. Spiel für einen Schauspieler, 1991.
Traum der Literatur - Literatur des Traums, 1991.
Wassermänner. Lesestücke aus Seen, Wüsten und Wohnzimmern, 1991.
Hexenherz, 1994.
Die Schrift des Freundes, 1998.
Fingerkraut und Feenhandschuh. Ein literarisches Gartentagebuch, 1999.
Schamanenbaum. Gedichte, 2001.
Amy oder Die Metamorphose, 2002.
Die Entschlüsselung, 2003.
Der Sommer, in dem Anna verschwunden war, 2004.
 Woher wir kommen, 2012.

External links
 https://web.archive.org/web/20070921175439/http://www.feministische-sf.de/einzelne_autorinnen/fsf_barbara-frischmuth.html
 http://www.ariadnebooks.com/ProductInfo.aspx?productid=0929497759
 http://www.litencyc.com/php/speople.php?rec=true&UID=5809
 https://web.archive.org/web/20070930181509/http://www.literaturhaus.at/buch/buch/rez/frischmuth01/bio.html

1941 births
Living people
Austrian women poets
Anton Wildgans Prize winners